De Proefbrouwerij is a Flemish brewery founded in 1996 by Dirk Naudts and his wife Saskia Waerniers. The brewery is located in the village of Lochristi, near Ghent. They operate as a rental brewery, creating beers for third party brewers, as well as producing their own beers. They also operate a research and development department focused on the science of brewing.

De Proef Beers 

The brewery releases its own brand of beers under the moniker "Reinaert", these include: a flemish red ale (9%), an amber beer (7%), a tripel (9%), and a grand cru (9.5%).

Gypsy Brewers 
The brewery operates predominantly as a rental brewery, and provide the brewing facilities to many gypsy breweries who do not have their own facilities, or who want to produce experimental small batch beers.

Notable Breweries Using De Proef 
 Bell's (USA)
 Surly (USA)
 Mikkeller (Denmark)
 The Musketeers (Belgium)
 To Øl (Denmark)
 Prearis (Belgium)
 Bieren Van Begeerte (Belgium)
 Duits & Lauret (the Netherlands)
 Amazing Brewing Co. (South Korea)
 The Booth Brewing Co. (South Korea)
 Magpie Brewing Co. (South Korea)
 Omnipollo (Sweden)
 Brulandselva (Norway)
 Lowlander Botanical Beers (The Netherlands)

References

External links

1996 establishments in Belgium
Breweries of Flanders
Companies based in East Flanders
Lochristi